Haseki Sultan Imaret was an Ottoman public soup kitchen established in Jerusalem to feed the poor during the reign of Suleiman the Magnificent. The imaret was part of a massive Waqf complex built in 1552 by Haseki Hürrem Sultan, better known in the West as Roxelana, the favorite wife of Sultan Suleiman I. This soup kitchen was said to have fed at least 500 people twice a day.

Haseki Sultan Waqf complex

The Haseki Sultan waqf complex was constructed at the height of the Ottoman era. In addition to the soup kitchen, the complex consisted of a mosque, a 55-room pilgrim hospice, and an inn (khan) for travellers. With the consent of her husband, Haseki Hürrem Sultan used the revenues from various assets to build and maintain it. These assets included land in Palestine and Tripoli, as well as shops, public bath houses, soap factories, and flourmills. When villages were endowed, the percentage of their revenues formerly paid in taxes was redirected to the waqf. The villages whose revenues paid for Haseki Sultan Imaret were Bait Dajan, Yazur, Kafr Ana, Ludd, Anaba, and Jib, among others. The Haseki Sultan Imaret not only fulfilled the religious requirement to give charity, but reinforced the social order and helped the Ottoman Empire project a political image of power and generosity.

Religious significance
Charity is an important component in Islam. In order to secure a place in paradise after death, one must assist those who cannot help themselves. There are two categories of charity in Qur'anic injunctions: Zakat, an obligatory alms tax for Muslims who obtained a certain level of wealth; and Sadaqah, voluntary donations that are highly recommended. One of the most popular forms of Sadaqa was waqfs, or endowments. Waqfs were founded by wealthy individuals, especially members of the imperial family, who donated their properties to permanently benefit a variety of charitable institutions. Public soup kitchens, therefore, were waqfs that provided basic nutritional sustenance for people in need. In the case of Haseki Sultan Imaret, Hürrem Sultan built a soup kitchen in Jerusalem because it was a holy city, along with Hebron, Mecca and Medina. She wanted to ensure that each of the holy cities had an institution to feed the hungry.

Social implications
Like other imarets throughout the Ottoman Empire, the Haseki Sultan Imaret was a tool for maintaining social order. The administrators, employees and beneficiaries of the imaret represented the social hierarchy of the community. The administrators were often members of the local noble families, and had the power to recruit friends, relatives and free slaves as employees of the imaret. Social status determined the order and amount of food distribution. During the meal, employees were the first to receive a ladle of soup and two loaves of bread, followed by the guests, who received one ladle and one loaf, and then the poor, who received the smallest amount of food. There was also a hierarchy among the poor: the learned poor ate first, followed by the men, and finally the women and children. If the food ran out, the women and children remained unfed. Consequently, the imaret not only revealed the social hierarchy of Jerusalem, but was an effective method of keeping people in line.

Political implications
There were strong political motives for building a soup kitchen in Jerusalem. It was "an integral component of the Ottoman project of settlement, colonization, legitimization and urban development." The Haseki Sultan Imaret demonstrated the far-reaching strength and power of the Ottoman Empire and was also an effective means of controlling its subjects in Jerusalem. By granting the administrator position to the most important families of Jerusalem, the Sultan used the extensive influences and connections of the nobles to strengthen their rule in the local population. Nevertheless, dependence on nobles to maximize political control also had a detrimental effect on the maintenance of the imaret.

The Jerusalem imaret was among five sponsored by the royal couple, the other four also being built in cities central to the projection of Ottoman power: at Istanbul (Constantinople) and Edirne (Adrianople) they stood at the seats of the Ottoman dynasty, while two were established at the Muslim Holy Places, Mecca and Medina. The first mosque complex was built in Istanbul in 1537–1539, right after the 1536 execution of grand vizier Ibrahim Pasha, for which Roxelana was rumoured to have been the instigator, and the intention was certainly to improve her image. Jerusalem had a symbolic importance for all Muslims beyond its modest size due to its connection to Prophet Muhammad, and Suleyman had an interest in making his mark in this city only recently conquered by his father from the Mamluks, who had embellished it with numerous sumptuous institutions and buildings. Christian pilgrims to Jerusalem might have been another intended target, but they proved to be hard to impress.

Later abuse
Heavy Ottoman reliance on the noble families granted them significant authority in the operations of the imaret, which constituted more than "just another poor-relief institution, but also a special fund used for granting benefits to certain favourite people." Administrators manipulated the criteria for becoming a beneficiary to favour their friends and relatives, or to gain favour from others. Additionally, the rights to being a beneficiary were transferable, further compounding the problem of excessive beneficiaries. Eventually, the imaret supported even the richest families in Jerusalem. Moreover, these powerful beneficiaries used their status to exploit the financial and material resources of the institution. For instance, a legal document in 1782 mentioned that a mercenary army commander was entitled to 48 loaves of bread from the imaret daily. By the 18th century, the corruption was so widespread that the imaret was no longer economically viable. Attempts to reduce food distributions and beneficiaries were met with fierce opposition and blatant disregard. Throughout the rest of its rule, the Ottoman Empire struggled to "find the delicate balance between the need to cut down and restrict the number of the waqf's beneficiaries, and the wish to collect the maximum political gain by granting benefits to the greatest possible number of people." Despite these problems, the Haseki Sultan Imaret continued to function, although not always to the benefit of the intended beneficiaries, "the poor and wretched, weak and needy."

References

Bibliography

 
  Suleiman's and Hürrem Sultan's Jerusalem imaret is referred to here.

Further reading

External links
 "Al-‘Imara al-‘Amira", detailed article at enjoyjerusalem.com (re-accessed January 2022)
 "Old City of Jerusalem Revitalization Program Honored With Architectural Award": restoration of Old City Muslim buildings and pictures of the soup kitchen. Washington Report on Middle East Affairs Sep/Oct 2005, pp. 24-25 (re-accessed January 2022).
 "Dar al-Aytam al-Islamiyya Restoration", for the wider surrounding complex including the soup kitchen. At ArchNet.org.
 My Memories of Khassaki Sultan or "The Flourishing Edifice", for a personal story about the imaret (re-accessed January 2022)
 Haseki Hürrem Sultan for more information about the sultana at Turkish "Ottomania and Turcomania" website (re-accessed January 2022)

Buildings and structures of the Ottoman Empire
Former buildings and structures in Jerusalem